State Route 207 (SR 207) is a  state highway in western Douglas County, Nevada, United States. Commonly known as the Kingsbury Grade, it is one of three Nevada highways that connect the western edge of the state to the Lake Tahoe region through the Carson Range. The route was part of State Route 19 prior to 1976.

Route description

From there, the route heads eastward on an uphill climb through the Kingsbury area to travel through Daggett Pass (elevation ).

After exiting the pass, SR 207 continues its trek eastward through Toiyabe National Forest lands. It goes through several switchbacks, eventually turning southward as it descends the mountains. The road goes down an escarpment to the Carson Valley floor. SR 207 comes to an end at its junction with Foothill Road (SR 206), at the site of Mottsville west of Gardnerville.

History

A road connecting Lake Tahoe to the Carson Valley, situated in the approximate location of today's SR 207, appears on Nevada state maps as early as 1919. By 1929, this unimproved road was included in the state highway system as the northwestern end of the former SR 19, a longer route stretching from Lake Tahoe through Minden and south to the California state line near Holbrook. SR 19 through the mountains remained unimproved for many years; the route was not paved until 1967. By 1968, the eastern end of the Kingsbury Grade was moved southwards to line up with what is now Mottsville Lane, mirroring the approximately  alignment of the present highway.

Following the realignment, the Kingsbury Grade section of SR 19 was not altered until the 1976 renumbering of Nevada's state highway system on July 1, 1976. In that process, this portion of SR 19 was assigned to the new SR 207. This change was first seen on state highway maps in 1978. The route has been largely unchanged since.

Major intersections

See also

 List of state routes in Nevada
 List of highways numbered 207

References

External links

207
State Route 207
Central Overland Route